Darwin's 97 Seven is a radio station that aims to broadcast the Christian message of salvation to the Greater Darwin and Palmerston region and now even to the Rural areas extending past Humpty Doo. Along with broadcasting a wide variety of Christian music and secular music, 97 Seven carries content from other Christian radio stations and ministries including Focus on the Family, Adventures in Odyssey and 'Enjoying Everyday Life'.

It was previously known as "97.7 Rhema FM".

See also
Rhema FM

External links
Official website

References 

Christian radio stations in Australia
Community radio stations in Australia
Radio stations in Darwin, Northern Territory